In molecular biology, the apolipophorin III family of proteins are a family of exchangeable apolipoproteins. Exchangeable apolipoproteins constitute a functionally important family of proteins that play critical roles in lipid transport and lipoprotein metabolism. Apolipophorin III (apoLp-III) is a prototypical exchangeable apolipoprotein found in many insect species that functions in transport of diacylglycerol (DAG) from the fat body lipid storage depot to flight muscles in the adult life stage. The special lipoproteins they form are called lipophorins.

References

Protein families